ADAS or Adas may refer to:

Science and technology
 Advanced driver-assistance systems, electronic systems that aid a vehicle driver while driving
 Asiago-DLR Asteroid Survey, a former project to search for comets and asteroids
 Architecture Design and Assessment System, a former set of software programs
 AWOS Data Acquisition System, an FAA computer system used with automated airport weather stations

Other uses
 ADAS (company), a UK-based environmental consultancy 
 Australian Diver Accreditation Scheme, for occupational divers
 Adas Bank, a submerged bank off the west coast of India 
 Michael Adas (born 1943), American historian
 Adas Juškevičius (born 1989), Lithuanian professional basketball player

See also
 Adath Israel (disambiguation)
 Adath Jeshurun (disambiguation)
 Adath Shalom (disambiguation)
 Ada (disambiguation)